Autódromo de Tocancipá is a motor racing circuit located in Tocancipá, Cundinamarca, Colombia. It is the official headquarters of the 6 Hours of Bogotá, Campeonato Nacional de Automovilismo (CNA), and TC2000 Colombia.

History

Based on an idea launched in 1980, Autódromo de Tocancipá was inaugurated on 7 February 1982, two years after Autódromo Ricardo Mejía was demolished.

On the nearby Kartódromo Juan Pablo Montoya, an annual kart race takes place, bringing together many international drivers each year.

Layout
Autódromo de Tocancipá is normally raced in a clockwise direction; however, 6 Hours of Bogotá is raced in a counterclockwise direction.

References 

1982 establishments in Colombia
Tocancipa